Tegermenevo (Tigermän) is a rural locality (a village) in Staroakbulyakovsky Selsoviet, Karaidelsky District, Bashkortostan, Russia. The population was 432 as of 2010. There are 8 streets.

Geography 
Tegermenevo is located 23 km northwest of Karaidel (the district's administrative centre) by road. Yuldashevo is the nearest rural locality.

References 

Rural localities in Karaidelsky District